The Anatra V.I. (for Voisin-Ivanov, not the Roman numeral VI) was a Russian reconnaissance aircraft of World War I. It was a redesign of the French Voisin Type L undertaken by Podporuchik Piotr Ivanov in Zhmerynka. The Voisin's fuselage pod was replaced by a streamlined, plywood construction that included an all-new mount for the observer's machine gun and an aluminium firewall between the pilot's cockpit and the aircraft's fuel tank. The wings and landing gear were strengthened as well. Despite the machine's greater weight, it was 20 km/h (12 mph) faster in the air than the Voisin that it was based on, and was quickly ordered into production. In practice, however, the aircraft that reached operational units were poorly built and therefore disliked by their crews.

Operators

Imperial Russian Air Force

Soviet Air Force - Taken over from the Imperial Russian Air Force.

Specifications (variant)

References
 
 Russian Aviation Museum
 airwar.ru

Single-engined pusher aircraft
VI
Biplanes
1910s Russian military reconnaissance aircraft
Military aircraft of World War I
Aircraft first flown in 1916